Syrnola vanhareni is a species of sea snail, a marine gastropod mollusk in the family Pyramidellidae, the pyrams and their allies.

Distribution
This species occurs in the following locations:
 European waters (ERMS scope) : Canary Islands at depths between 200 m and 585 m.

References

 Peñas A. & Rolán E., 1999. La familia Pyramidellidae Gray, 1840 (Mollusca, Gastropoda, Heterostropha) en Africa Occidental. 4. los géneros Megastomia, Odostomia, Noemiamea y Syrnola. Iberus, suplemento 5: 1-150

External links
 To Biodiversity Heritage Library (1 publication)
 To CLEMAM
 To Encyclopedia of Life
 To World Register of Marine Species

Pyramidellidae
Gastropods described in 1998
Molluscs of the Canary Islands